St. Bursouma's Orthodox Syrian Church is a parish of the Malankara Orthodox Syrian Church in Attuva (between Pandalam and Mavelikara) in the Alappuzha district of Kerala, India. It is under the Chengannur Orthodox Diocese. Mar Bursouma is its patron saint.

The parish was established in 1912, one of the first Malankara Orthodox Syrian churches established in the name of Mar Bursouma. It celebrated its centenary jubilee in February 2012.

Institutions
St. Bursouma's Public School & Junior College

Churches in Alappuzha district
Malankara Orthodox Syrian church buildings
Churches completed in 1912
1912 establishments in India
20th-century churches in India
20th-century Oriental Orthodox church buildings